Tehuacana Creek is a creek in Texas that is a tributary of the Brazos River.
Tehuacana Creek rises three miles south of Penelope in southern Hill County (at 31°50' N, 96°54' W) and runs twenty-eight miles southwest to its mouth on the Brazos River, one mile east of Waco (31°31' N, 97°02' W). It enters McLennan County five miles from Penelope. The surrounding flat to rolling terrain is surfaced by dark, commonly calcareous clays and clay and sandy loams that support mesquite, cacti, water-tolerant hardwoods, conifers, and grasses. For most of the county's history, the area has been used as range and crop land.

See also
List of rivers of Texas

References

 
 USGS Geographic Names Information Service
 USGS Hydrologic Unit Map - State of Texas (1974)

Hill County, Texas
Rivers of Texas